Segun Ogundipe (born 3 September 2000) is a Nigerian cricketer. In October 2019, he was named in Nigeria's squad for the 2019 ICC T20 World Cup Qualifier tournament in the United Arab Emirates. In October 2021, he was named in Nigeria's Twenty20 International (T20I) squad for their series against Sierra Leone. He made his T20I debut on 20 October 2021, for Nigeria against Sierra Leone.

References

External links
 

2000 births
Living people
Nigerian cricketers
Nigeria Twenty20 International cricketers
Place of birth missing (living people)